The Kulamba Wildlife Reserve is situated in Sabah, Malaysia, and covers . It is an area protected under state law and is particularly significant for the conservation of orangutans.

See also
 Geography of Malaysia

References

Wildlife sanctuaries of Malaysia
Protected areas of Sabah